Jan Patrik Vilhelm Brinkmann von Druffel-Egloffstein (born 1966 in Motala, Sweden), with nickname "Tissa", is a Swedish-German businessman, entrepreneur and patron with interests in the mining industry and real estate. Brinkmann has funded political projects and held senior positions in conservative and nationalist organizations.

He has worked with and for a number of European and Asian parties, including Freedom Party of Austria FPÖ, Vlaams Belang Belgium, United Kingdom Independence Party UKIP, Islamists critical Pro-Bewegung Germany, Bharatiya Janata Party (BJP) India and United National Party (UNP) in Sri Lanka, both directly and through patron activities in support of conservative and nationalist organisations.

Biography

Early life and education 
Already in the eighties, Brinkmann developed a passionate interest in cultural-political and social affairs - an interest that has shaped him to this day. Brinkmann's mentors in geopolitics were Oleg Alekseyewich Grinevsky, a Russian diplomat, former ambassador to Sweden, political scientist, Cand.Sc. (history) and author as well as Prof. Dr. Wjatscheslaw Iwanowitsch Dashichew, he observed Mikhail Gorbachev as a foreign policy advisor and is considered a pioneer of East-West détente. Brinkmann has German family roots and grew up in Sweden. In his younger years Brinkmann was involved in the Pentecostal movement, doing humanitarian work in Sri Lanka among other places.

Business and political activism 
Brinkmann was in the late 1980s and 1990s active mainly in real estate investment, during the late 1990s Brinkmann added to his attention natural resources, mainly metal exploration and mining but was also investing in the oil sector, Brinkmann has been part-owner in several companies for example Fingerprint Cards, Naxs AB, Westsiberian Resources Ltd and Wiking Mineral AB over the years.

In 2004, Brinkmann set up the Continent Europe Foundation, which included far-right leaders in various European countries. Its board included two leaders of the neo-Nazi National Democratic Party of Germany. Its goals were opposing immigration and Americanism, and supporting a white "pan-European civilization", according to German intelligence. Der Spiegel reported in 2008 that Brinkmann had moved the foundation's operations from a post office box address in Jönköping, Sweden, to a villa in Berlin bought by his wife, and that Brinkmann was "a leading figure in the international far-right scene". Neighbors in Berlin noticed  visitors with limousines and bodyguards at the villa. Brinkmann and the foundation organized conferences and collaborations between activists, academics, and writers. Among others, Mikhail Gorbachev's former adviser Professor Wjatscheslaw Iwanowitsch Daschitschew played a role, as Brinkmann advocated a rapprochement between Europe and Russia.

Brinkmann sought a dialogue between European and Israeli right-wing parties and made a visit to the Knesset with Kent Ekeroth of the Sweden Democrats and Mike Huckabee, ex-governor of Arkansas. The efforts caused controversies in Israel and Europe.

Since 2011, Brinkmann is no longer politically active and instead focusses on his businesses, which he said suffered from the attention surrounding his political activities. When former Minister Sven-Otto Littorin joined the Board of Wiking Mineral in 2012 it caused a stir in the Swedish press, which ended with Littorin reporting Expressen to the Press Ombudsman.

Brinkmann said he had changed some of his views and opinion toward a more pro-Islam stance, stating that "The Muslim view on families supports a positive demographic development and is good as counterpoint to all the single men in the Sweden Democrats party". Brinkmann attributed his changed views to "having gotten to know some immigrants of the Muslim faith". 

In July 2014, Brinkmann announced that he planned to live part-time in Hungary. He praised the Hungarian investment climate, culturally conservative social climate, and the national conservative government including Hungary’s prime minister, Viktor Orbán.

Personal life 
Since 2007 he lives mainly in Berlin, between 2014 and 2018 he divided his time between Berlin and Budapest, since 2018 he lives alternately in Berlin and Colombo. He is married and has six children. 

He has come to approach the Eastern Orthodox Church. He is considered by many to have a Buddhist philosophy and he has a close relationship with Buddhist traditions and Sri Lanka for more than three decades.

References 

1964 births
Living people
Businesspeople from Berlin
Alt-right activists
Swedish businesspeople